The Jewel Ornament of Liberation or Ornament of Precious Liberation is a key text in the Kagyu tradition of Tibetan Buddhism  that is said to capture the essence of both the Kadampa and Kagyüpa lineages of Mahayana teachings. The text was written by Gampopa (1074-1153 C.E.), one of the two most important disciples of Milarepa.

Gampopa, both a Kadampa monk and Vajrayana student of the famed yogi Milarepa, based this text on Atisha's "Lamp for the Path to Enlightenment". Khunu Lama Rinpoche said that this was the first lamrim text written in Tibet and that all the later great lamrim texts were based on The Jewel Ornament of Liberation. It's a critically important text to study as a foundation for the traditional three year retreat.

Gampopa said, "For anyone who wishes to see me, studying The Jewel Ornament of Liberation and The Precious Garland of the Excellent Path is the same as meeting me." This text contains the complete form of Mahayana Buddhism—from the starting point of Buddha-nature, all the way to enlightenment.

Outline
The text is structured around the following points:
The primary cause: buddha nature.
The support: precious human existence.
The contributory cause: the spiritual teacher. 
The methods of practice.
The result: perfect buddhahood. 
The activities of the Buddha.

Buddha Nature
According to The Jewel Ornament, all living beings, even the smallest insects, have the potential of Buddhahood. All beings have this same essence, or Buddha nature. Gampopa presented the example of the sesame seed and sesame seed oil. Though the oil is present in the seed, there are steps to take to separate (or realize) the oil.

Translations into English
The text by Gampopa was first translated into English by Herbert Guenther in 1959. More recent translations include the one by Khenpo Konchog Gyaltsen Rinpoche in 1998. Ken Holmes's translation, entitled Ornament of Precious Liberation, was published in 2017.

Tibetan Text
དམ་ཆོས་ཡིད་བཞིན་གྱི་ནོར་བུ་ཐར་པ་རིན་པོ་ཆེའི་རྒྱན་, dam chos yid bzhin gyi nor bu thar pa rin po che'i rgyan

References 

Tibetan Buddhist texts
12th-century books
12th century in Tibet